Adam McKeown (born 1 February 2000) is a Northern Irish international lawn and indoor bowler.

Bowls career
McKeown won the British Isles U-18 title in 2017. Two years later he won the singles bronze medal at the 2019 Atlantic Bowls Championships. Indoors he has won the mixed doubles title at the 2019/20 IIBC Championships.

In 2022, he competed in the men's triples and the men's fours at the 2022 Commonwealth Games. In the fours the team of McKeown, Sam Barkley, Ian McClure and Martin McHugh won the gold medal defeating India in the final. Just one month later he won his first national title when winning the open singles at the Irish National Bowls Championships.

References

Male lawn bowls players from Northern Ireland
2000 births
Living people
Bowls players at the 2022 Commonwealth Games
Commonwealth Games gold medallists for Northern Ireland
Commonwealth Games medallists in lawn bowls
Medallists at the 2022 Commonwealth Games